Archie Raymond "Bunt" Kirk (born July 9, 1890) was an American football player and coach. He served as the head football coach at Simpson College in Indianola, Iowa in 1915, compiling a record of 2–6.  Kirk was a 1915 graduate of the University of Iowa, where played college football as a tackle and was a member of the Sigma Alpha Epsilon fraternity.

Head coaching record

References

1890 births
Year of death missing
American football tackles
Iowa Hawkeyes football players
Simpson Storm football coaches